Richard Hartvig Bagger (born March 27, 1960) is an American Republican Party politician from New Jersey, and former State Senator who later served as chief of staff to Governor Chris Christie. He left the Christie administration in early 2012, and is now an Executive Vice President with Celgene. He is a resident of Westfield, New Jersey.

Life and career
Bagger was born in Plainfield, New Jersey. Raised in nearby Westfield, Bagger attended Westfield High School. He received an A.B. in 1982 from the School of Public and International Affairs at Princeton University and a J.D. from Rutgers University School of Law.

Bagger served as a Planning Board member, Councilman, and Mayor of Westfield, New Jersey during the 1980s and 1990s.  He was elected to the New Jersey General Assembly from the 22nd Legislative District in 1991, succeeding Chuck Hardwick, his longtime mentor.  During his time as an assemblyman, he served as Chairman of the Appropriations Committee and was elected to be Majority Conference Leader.  In 2000, he declined a race to succeed Bob Franks in Congress.  In 2001, he was elected to the New Jersey Senate for the 21st Legislative District.  He resigned as a State Senator in 2003 in order to pursue private business interests and was succeeded by Thomas Kean Jr. Bagger remained a political leader in Union County after leaving the legislature.

Earlier in his career, Bagger was an Assistant General Counsel to Horizon Blue Cross and Blue Shield of New Jersey and practiced law with the firm of McCarter and English.  After leaving the Senate, he worked as Senior Vice President of Public Affairs and Policy for Pfizer.  He also was a member of the NJN Foundation Board of Trustees as well as Board Chair of the Healthcare Institute of New Jersey and the National Pharmaceutical Council. In December 2009, then-Governor-elect Chris Christie appointed Bagger as his chief of staff. He served in that role until January 2012.

Bagger served on the Port Authority of New York and New Jersey Board of Commissioners, having been confirmed by the New Jersey State Senate on June 28, 2012 and remained on the Board until June 2021. He was Chair of the Gateway Program Development Corporation in 2017, served on the Board of the National September 11 Memorial and Museum while a Port Authority Commissioner, and joined the Board of the Regional Plan Association in 2022. 

Bagger was Executive Director of the 2016 transition planning team of Donald Trump, after his friend and close associate Chris Christie endorsed him and was named Chair of the planning group. After Christie was dropped by Trump as leader of the transition team in favor of Mike Pence, Bagger left the transition team on the same day. In May 2017, Bagger was appointed to the President's Commission on White House Fellowships and served there until 2021.

Bagger is also an adjunct faculty member of the Eagleton Institute at Rutgers University, and a Director of Tonix Pharmaceuticals, the Leukemia and Lymphoma Society,  and  the U.S. Chamber of Commerce.

References

|-

|-

1960 births
20th-century American politicians
21st-century American politicians
Chiefs of staff to United States state governors
Living people
Mayors of places in New Jersey
Republican Party members of the New Jersey General Assembly
Republican Party New Jersey state senators
Politicians from Plainfield, New Jersey
People from Westfield, New Jersey
Rutgers School of Law–Newark alumni
Princeton School of Public and International Affairs alumni
Westfield High School (New Jersey) alumni